Layout may refer to:
 Page layout, the arrangement of visual elements on a page
 Comprehensive layout (comp), a proposed page layout presented by a designer to their client
 Layout (computing), the process of calculating the position of objects in space
 Layout engine, another name for web browser engine, the core software that displays content in a web browser
 Automobile layout, a description of the locations of the engine and drive wheels on a vehicle 
 Integrated circuit layout, the representation of an integrated circuit in geometric shapes
 Keyboard layout, an arrangement of the keys on a typographic keyboard
 Model railroad layout, a diorama with tracks for operating scaled-down trains
Layout (dominoes), the tableau in a domino game
 Layout or marking out, the transfer of a design onto a workpiece in manufacturing
  Plant layout study, an engineering study to analyze physical configurations for a manufacturing plant
 Layout, a specific version of the splits, a position in which the legs are extended in opposite directions
 Process layout, a floor plan of a plant that arranges equipment according to its function 
 Product layout, a floor plan of a plant in which work stations and equipment are ordered by assembly sequence